Bioty Moise Kean (born 28 February 2000) is an Italian professional footballer who plays as a forward for Serie A club Juventus and the Italy national team.

Kean started his career with Juventus in 2016, winning a domestic double (league and cup) in his first season with the club. He spent the following season on loan with Hellas Verona before returning to Juventus the next season, winning another Serie A title in 2019. In the summer of that year, Kean joined English side Everton, who loaned him to French club Paris Saint-Germain in 2020, and to Juventus in 2021.

At the international level, Kean made his senior debut for Italy in 2018. He is the third-youngest goalscorer for Italy in a competitive match, behind Wilfried Gnonto and Bruno Nicolè.

Early life
Kean was born in Vercelli to Ivorian parents Biorou and Isabelle. When his parents separated when he was four years old, he and his two brothers moved with his mother to Asti, where he spent the rest of his childhood and adolescent years.

Club career

Youth career

Kean was first noticed by Renato Biasi, who included him in the youth teams of Asti before offering him to Torino. In 2010, however, instead of renewing with Torino, he was signed by the team's cross-city rivals Juventus on a free transfer. In the 2015–16 season, Kean scored 24 goals in 25 games for Juventus U19.

Juventus

2016–17: Debut season 
Upon doing so, he became the club's youngest-ever debutant and the first player born in the 2000s to play in one of Europe's four major leagues.

On 22 November, he became the first player born in the 2000s to feature in a UEFA Champions League match, after being substituted on in the 84th minute of a 3–1 away win over Sevilla. On 27 May 2017, Juventus' final match of the 2016–17 Serie A season, Kean scored his first goal for Juventus, the winning goal of a 2–1 away victory over Bologna, also becoming the first player born in the 2000s to score a goal in one of Europe's five major leagues.

2017–18: Loan to Verona 
On 31 August 2017, after extending his contract until 30 June 2020, Kean was loaned to Hellas Verona on a one-year deal. On 10 September, he made his debut for Verona in the Serie A as a substitute, replacing Alex Ferrari in the 46th minute in a 5–0 home defeat against Fiorentina. On 1 October, Kean scored his first goal for Verona in the 87th minute of a 2–2 away draw against Torino.

On 28 January 2018, Kean scored his first Serie A brace in a 4–1 away win against Fiorentina, becoming only the second player born in the 2000s after Pietro Pellegri to have done so. He played 20 games and scored four goals for Verona.

2018–19: Return to Juventus 
Upon his return from loan, Kean's first goal for Juventus in the 2018–19 season came on 12 January 2019, scoring in a 2–0 away win over Bologna in the Coppa Italia. On 8 March, Kean scored two goals in the first half against Udinese, in an eventual 4–1 home win.

On 2 April 2019, Kean scored the second goal in a 2–0 away win against Cagliari, during which Kean was subject to racist chants from a section of Cagliari fans. Juventus teammate Leonardo Bonucci was heavily criticised after stating that Kean was partly to blame by his celebration which caused further jeers. England international Raheem Sterling deemed Bonucci's comment "laughable", compatriot Mario Balotelli, English rapper Stormzy, and former Juventus player Paul Pogba all also defended Moise.

In Juventus's following match on 6 April, Kean came off the bench against AC Milan to score the winning goal in a 2–1 home win in Serie A, putting his side just one victory away from winning the league title. The following league match, on 13 April, Kean scored the first goal in a 2–1 away defeat against SPAL, marking his sixth-consecutive goal in as many matches for club and country.

Everton
Kean joined Everton on 4 August 2019, signing a five-year contract for a fee of €27.5 million, plus €2.5 million in add-ons. On 10 August, he made his Everton debut in a 0–0 draw against Crystal Palace in the Premier League, coming on as a substitute for Dominic Calvert-Lewin. In November 2019, Kean was dropped from Everton's match-day squad for disciplinary reasons. He scored his first goal for Everton on 21 January 2020, in a 2–2 home draw against Newcastle United in the Premier League.

For the last game of the season, Kean was handed a start, and scored his second goal for Everton, equalising against Bournemouth in the 41st minute, a game Everton went on to lose.

2020–21: Loan to Paris Saint-Germain 
Kean began the 2020–21 season at Everton, and scored two goals in two EFL Cup matches.

On 4 October 2020, he joined Ligue 1 club Paris Saint-Germain in a one-year loan. He made his debut in a 4–0 league away win against Nîmes on 16 October; he did not score a goal, but saw a headed attempt ricochet off the crossbar. In the following league game on 24 October, Kean's first goals for the club came in the form of a brace against Dijon, in a 4–0 win. On 28 October, in Paris Saint-Germain's next game, Kean scored his first Champions League goals, scoring a brace against Turkish club İstanbul Başakşehir in the group stage.

On 10 February 2021, Kean made his Coupe de France debut; he scored the only goal of the match in a 1–0 win over Caen to take PSG to the round of 32. Kean's first goal in the Champions League knockout stage came on 16 February, scoring a header in a 4–1 away win at Barcelona in the first leg of the round of 16.

Return to Juventus 
During the 2021–22 season, after his return from his loan, Kean was sent-off in Everton's 2–1 win against Huddersfield.
On 31 August 2021, Kean returned to Juventus on a two-year loan deal for a loan fee of €7 million, with an obligation to buy in summer 2023 for a reported €28 million plus €3 million in add-ons. Kean's debut came on 11 September, as a substitute, in a 2–1 defeat to Napoli; in the 85th minute, Kean made a mistake which helped Napoli's Kalidou Koulibaly score the winning goal. On 22 September, Kean debuted as a starter against Spezia and scored the opening goal, his first since his return. On 8 December, Kean scored the winning goal in a 1–0 win against Malmö, his first in the Champions League with Juventus.

The transfer was made permanent on 8 March 2023.

International career
Kean was eligible to represent both Italy and the Ivory Coast, being born in Italy to Ivorian parents.

Youth

Kean represented Italy at under-15 level in 2015. With the Italy U17 team he took part at the 2016 and 2017 editions of the UEFA European Under-17 Championship, scoring a goal in each tournament.

With Italy U19 Kean took part in the 2018 UEFA European Under-19 Championship, scoring in the group stage against Norway, and in the semi-final against France in a 2–0 win to help Italy reach the final. He started the final against Portugal on the bench, and came on as a substitute, scoring two goals in the second half to take the tie to extra time; the match eventually ended in a 4–3 victory for Portugal.

Kean made his debut with the Italy U21 team on 11 October 2018, in a friendly match lost 1–0 against Belgium in Udine. He scored his first goal with the U21 side in the following friendly game, a 2–0 home win against Tunisia on 15 October 2018. He took part in the 2019 UEFA European Under-21 Championship, where Italy were eliminated in the group stage.

Senior

In November 2018, Kean was called up to the Italy senior side by manager Roberto Mancini. On 20 November, aged , he made his senior debut with Italy in a friendly match against the United States in Belgium, which eventually ended in a 1–0 victory.

On 23 March 2019, Kean made his first start and scored his first goal for Italy in a 2–0 home win over Finland in Italy's opening UEFA Euro 2020 qualifying match. In doing so, he broke several national records: he became the youngest forward to start a match for Italy since Edoardo Mariani started against France in 1912.

On 26 March, Kean scored his second international goal in Italy's following Euro 2020 qualifier, a 6–0 home win over Liechtenstein.

Style of play
Regarded as one of Italian football's most promising prospects, Kean is a quick, tenacious, and physically strong forward, with good technical skills and an accurate shot. Naturally right-footed, his preferred role is in the centre as a main striker, although he is also capable of playing as a second striker, or even as a left-sided forward or winger. He is known in particular for his great pace, ability in the air, offensive movement, and powerful physique, which enable him either to hold up the ball with his back to goal or take advantage of openings in the opposition's defence; a hard-working player, he has also been praised for his defensive contribution off the ball.

Personal life
Kean's older brother, Giovanni, is also a footballer. He grew up a supporter of Inter Milan and idolised Obafemi Martins, their striker at that time.

Career statistics

Club

International

Italy score listed first, score column indicates score after each Kean goal.

Honours
Juventus
 Serie A: 2016–17, 2018–19
 Coppa Italia: 2016–17
 Supercoppa Italiana: 2018

Paris Saint-Germain
 Coupe de France: 2020–21
 Trophée des Champions: 2020

Italy U19
 UEFA European Under-19 Championship runner-up: 2018

Italy
 UEFA Nations League third place: 2020–21

Individual
 Serie A Player of the Month: November 2022

Notes

References

External links

 
 
 
 
 
 
 
 Profile at the Everton F.C. website
 

2000 births
Living people
People from Vercelli
Footballers from Piedmont
Italian footballers
Italy youth international footballers
Italy under-21 international footballers
Italy international footballers
Association football forwards
Juventus F.C. players
Hellas Verona F.C. players
Everton F.C. players
Paris Saint-Germain F.C. players
Serie A players
Premier League players
Ligue 1 players
Italian expatriate footballers
Expatriate footballers in England
Expatriate footballers in France
Italian expatriate sportspeople in England
Italian expatriate sportspeople in France
Italian people of Ivorian descent
Italian sportspeople of African descent
Sportspeople from the Province of Vercelli